Cale Loughrey (born August 4, 2001) is a Canadian professional soccer player who plays as a centre-back for the HFX Wanderers of the Canadian Premier League.

College career
In 2019, he attended Seneca College, playing for the men's soccer team. In his only season with Seneca, he was named team captain and MVP. He was also named an OCAA East Division First-Team All-Star.

In 2020, he moved to the University of Alabama at Birmingham, playing for the men's soccer team. He scored his first goal on September 26, 2020, against the Georgia Southern Eagles. He was named a Conference USA Third Team All Star for the 2020-21 season.

Club career
In 2018, Loughrey played for Darby FC in League1 Ontario.

In early 2019, he trained with Canadian Premier League club York9 FC. In 2019, he played for Unionville Milliken SC in League1 Ontario, scoring his first goal on June 22 against Aurora FC. He played in the CPL U21 showcase match for Team Ontario being named MVP.

In February 2022, he signed a contract with Forge FC of the Canadian Premier League. He made his debut on February 16 in a CONCACAF Champions League match against Mexican side Cruz Azul. On March 30, 2022, he was loaned to fellow CPL club FC Edmonton.

In February 2023, he signed a contract with the HFX Wanderers of the Canadian Premier League.

Career statistics

References

External links

2001 births
Living people
Association football defenders
Canadian soccer players
People from Ajax, Ontario
Soccer people from Ontario
Canadian expatriate soccer players
Expatriate soccer players in the United States
Canadian expatriate sportspeople in the United States
League1 Ontario players
Canadian Premier League players
Darby FC players
Unionville Milliken SC players
UAB Blazers men's soccer players
Forge FC players
FC Edmonton players
HFX Wanderers FC players
Seneca College alumni